The canton of Kourou (French: Canton de Kourou) is one of the former cantons of the Guyane department in French Guiana. It was located in the arrondissement of Cayenne. Its administrative seat was located in Kourou, the canton's sole commune. Its population was 25,490 in 2012.

Administration

References 

Kourou